Novozirikovo (Yañı Yerek) is a rural locality (a village) in Zilim-Karanovsky Selsoviet, Gafuriysky District, Bashkortostan, Russia. The population was 101 as of 2010. There is 1 street.

Geography 
Novozirikovo is located 40 km north of Krasnousolsky (the district's administrative centre) by road. Zirikovo is the nearest rural locality.

References 

Rural localities in Gafuriysky District